Annals of Northumbria may refer to:

Northern Annals, a Latin chronicle covering the years 732–806
Chronicle of 957, a Latin chronicle covering the years 888–957